Vyangya means satire in Hindi literature. Vyangya writings includes the essence of sarcasm and humour in Hindi literature. 
Some of the better known writers in this genre are Harishankar Parsai, Sri Lal Sukla, K. P. Saxena, Gyan Chaturvedi, Suryakumar Pandey, Sharad Joshi, etc.

Indian satire
Satirical books